Semniomima anubisalis is a moth in the family Crambidae. It is found in Brazil.

References

Moths described in 1934
Pyraustinae